Taherabad-e Torkha (also Romanized as Ţāherābād-e Torkhā; also known as Ţāherābād-e Tork, Ţāherābād, and Tirva) is a village in Pasakuh Rural District, Zavin District, Kalat County, Razavi Khorasan Province, Iran. At the 2006 census, its population was 138, in 32 families.

References 

Populated places in Kalat County